The Kincardine News is the premier news publication for the Municipality of Kincardine, Ontario, including the communities of Kincardine, Tiverton, Inverhuron, Bervie, Glammis and Armow, as well as serving the neighbouring Huron-Kinloss communities of Ripley and Point Clark.

Kincardine News is a member of the Ontario Community Newspapers Association (OCNA) and is owned by Postmedia. It received Blue Ribbons in 2006 and 2007.

See also
List of newspapers in Canada

References

External links
 Kincardine News Official Website

Postmedia Network publications
Weekly newspapers published in Ontario
Publications established in 1857
1857 establishments in Ontario